Benjaminsen is a surname. Notable people with the surname include:

Andrine Benjaminsen (born 1995), Norwegian orienteer and ski orienteer
Anne Benjaminsen (born 1964), Finnish ski-orienteering competitor
Erik Benjaminsen (born 1992), Norwegian soccer player 
Fróði Benjaminsen (born 1977), Faroese footballer
Juni Marie Benjaminsen (born 1999), Norwegian figure skater
Tone Benjaminsen, Norwegian racing cyclist
Vidar Benjaminsen (born 1962), Norwegian ski-orienteering competitor